Elisha Oscar Crosby (July 18, 1818 - June 25, 1895) was an American lawyer, politician and diplomat. He served as a member of the California State Senate from 1849 to 1852. As a state senator, he served as chair of the Judiciary Committee, and in that capacity prepared the committee report resulting in the enactment of a reception statute by which the newly formed state of California adopted the common law as the basis for its legal system.  He served as the United States Minister Resident to Guatemala from 1861 to 1864. By the 1870s, he settled in Alameda, California, where he became a justice of peace.

References

1818 births
1895 deaths
Politicians from Ithaca, New York
California state senators
California lawyers
Ambassadors of the United States to Guatemala
California pioneers
19th-century American politicians
19th-century American lawyers